Sum(me:r) is the ninth extended play by South Korean boy group Pentagon. The album was released on July 17, 2019 by Cube Entertainment under Kakao M distribution. Member Yan An did not participate in the activities due to health reasons.

The song was released through several music portals, including MelOn, iTunes, and Spotify.

In September, 2020, "Humph" become a hot topic on social media and internet communities. Korean Netizen opined "the song that is perfect for the COVID-19 pandemic situation." The lyrics "Do not cross the line Stop / No access to there are no access / Oh you have crossed the line right now / Oh, please keep it", the youthful melody and cute choreography of the song is good to use in a campaign to encourage social distancing. This resulting in becoming a meme song and the number of direct cam videos and music videos from the "Humph" music broadcast on YouTube is rapidly increasing.

Background 
This album uses Sum(me:r), which is a new meaning, by putting 'ME', which is a Pentagon in the Sum function, and 4 different 'R' (romance, rock n' roll, relax, and role). In other words, the themes pointed by the Pentagon and 'R' were combined to complete the track list of various charms. Title track "Humph!" is co-produced by Hui and Giriboy and is a witty and exciting hip hop genre, with lyrics expressing the younger times when they like someone so much but acted like they don't. Fantasytic is a dance song that can feel the strong coolness that blows away the heat wave. It expresses the meaning to spend a 'fantasy' day by the coined word '판타지스틱' (fantasy stick). Easy lyrics and addictive chorus allow listeners to feel the freedom of summer by getting out of the frustrating city. The third track, 'Summer!', is produced by Albin Nordqvist and Andreas Öberg who worked on numerous Asian pop artists' songs. The final track, 'Round 2 (Bonus Track)', is a bonus track for fans of the previous album 'Round 1', featuring lightweight trap bits and bright chord progression. This time, all the members of the Pentagon also wrote songs and compositions, creating a disc containing the pentatonic humorous code. The members add to the fun of the song by expressing each other cutely or ridiculously.

Composition 
"Humph!" is composed in the key of D major, with a tempo of 133 BPM. It is a chill hip-pop track that bounces along to a smooth piano and snapping melody over a rollicking, tinny beat. “Humph!” soars to its infectious chorus, during which the members of the K-pop boy band impishly request an apology from the object of their affection. The song, which is titled “접근금지” (“Forbidden” or “Off Limits” ) in Korean, features lyrics that reflect the childlike inclination to sulk and act mad when a romantic interest does something they don't like or doesn't pay them enough attention.

Promotions 
Pentagon held a live showcase at Blue Square Samsung Card Hall in Hannam-dong, Seoul before the release of the EP on July 17, where they performed "Humph!" along with "Fantasystic".

On July 17, Pentagon held a premiere showcase hosted by Mnet that was released over the Mnet K-POP and Mnet-M2 YouTube and Facebook channels to fans worldwide at 8pm (KST). They performed their title track 접근 금지 and two other new songs presented a total of four stages. On the same day, they appeared on MBC Every 1's Weekly Idol and Idol Radio. The group appeared as guests on JTBC's Run.wav  to promote the album, making their debut on the show.

Pentagon made their comeback stage starting July 17, 2019 through the music program The Show, Show Champion, M Countdown, Music Bank, and continued promoting the single on Inkigayo.

Music video 
"Humph!" was released alongside a fun music video that turns the members of Pentagon into quarrelsome schoolboys who partake in a baseball club, where they don uniforms featuring the New York Yankees' logo. Though only eight of Pentagon's nine members appear in the music video, the voice of Yan An, who is currently sitting out of group activities due to an injury, can be heard on the single.

Track listing

Accolades

Charts

Release history

References 

2019 EPs
Cube Entertainment EPs
Pentagon (South Korean band) EPs
Kakao M EPs
Albums produced by Hui (singer)
Albums produced by Wooseok
Albums produced by Kino (singer)
Albums produced by Yuto